Algonova is double-hulled tanker built for Algoma Tankers Limited, a subsidiary of Algoma Central. The tanker's construction began in 2006 at Ereğli Shipyard in Turkey as Eregli 04. The ship was launched in 2008 as Algonova after the tanker was purchased by Algoma Tankers Limited while still under construction. The ship services ports on the Great Lakes and the Saint Lawrence Seaway. Algonova is the second ship to bear the name.

Description
The ship has a gross tonnage (GT) of 8,009 and a deadweight tonnage (DWT) of 11,856 or 11,240 depending on the source. The ship is powered by a MaK 9M32C diesel engine rated at  driving one shaft with a controllable pitch propeller and a  bow thruster. Algonova is classified by Lloyd's Register to Finnish-Swedish ice class 1A.

Service history
The ship's keel was laid down on 21 March 2006 by Eregli Shipyard as Eregli 04 with the yard number 4. The tanker was purchased by Algoma Tankers Limited while still under construction in 2007 for CAN$43 million. The ship was acquired as part of Algoma Tankers Limited efforts to modernize its tanker fleet after regulations barred the use of single-hulled tankers on the Great Lakes and Saint Lawrence Seaway. Renamed Algonova, the vessel was launched on 17 April 2008. Delivery of the vessel was initially expected for February 2007. The ship was completed on 10 September 2008. Algonova services ports on the Great Lakes, Saint Lawrence Seaway and in Atlantic Canada. Algonovas ice class allows the vessel to deliver to ports on the Great Lakes during winter months.

References

2008 ships
Tankers of Canada
Algoma Central Marine
Ships built in Zonguldak